Hyperaspis triangulum, the triad lady beetle, is a species of lady beetle in the family Coccinellidae. It is found in North America.

References

Further reading

 

Coccinellidae
Articles created by Qbugbot
Beetles described in 1899